The government agencies in Iceland are state controlled organisations who act independently to carry out the policies of the Icelandic government.

Parliament

Agencies
Althing Ombudsman (Umboðsmaður Alþingis)
Icelandic National Audit Office (Ríkisendurskoðun)

Committees
Electoral Commission (Landskjörstjórn)

Prime Minister's Office

Agencies
Office of the Attorney General (Ríkislögmaður)
Office of the Ombudsman for Children (Umboðsmaður barna)
Thingvellir National Park (Þjóðgarðurinn á Þingvöllum)

Ministry of Education, Science and Culture

Agencies
Archaeological Heritage Agency of Iceland (Fornleifavernd ríkisins)
National Archives of Iceland (Þjóðskjalasafn Íslands)

Education
Playschools
Primary schools
Gymnasia
Further education institutions
Universities in Iceland
Music schools

Science
Scientific research institutions

Culture
County archives
Libraries
Municipality associations
Museums

Ministry for the Environment and Natural Resources

Agencies
Icelandic Meteorological Office (Veðurstofa Íslands)
Environment Agency of Iceland (Umhverfisstofnun)
Iceland Construction Authority (Mannvirkjastofnun)
Iceland Forest Service (Skógrækt ríkisins)
Iceland GeoSurvey (Íslenskar orkurannsóknir)
Icelandic Institute of Natural History (Náttúrufræðistofnun Íslands)
Icelandic National Planning Agency (Skipulagsstofnun)
Icelandic Recycling Fund (Úrvinnslusjóður)
Institute of Freshwater Fisheries (Veiðimálastofnun)
Myvatn Research Station (Náttúrurannsóknastöðin við Mývatn)
National Land Survey of Iceland (Landmælingar Íslands)
State Soil Conservation Service (Landgræðsla ríkisins)
Stefansson Arctic Institute (Stofnun Vilhjálms Stefánssonar)
Vatnajökull National (Vatnajökulsþjóðgarður)

Ministry for Foreign Affairs

Agencies
Icelandic International Development Agency (Þróunarsamvinnustofnun Íslands)

Ministry of Finance and Economic Affairs

Agencies
Central Bank of Iceland (Seðlabanki Íslands)
Directorate of Customs (Tollstjóri)
Directorate of Internal Revenue (Ríkisskattstjóri)
Government Construction Contracting Agency (Framkvæmdasýsla ríkisins)
Government Real Estate Agency (Fasteignir ríkissjóðs)
Icelandic State Financial Investments (Bankasýsla ríkisins)
State Alcohol and Tobacco Company of Iceland (Áfengis- og tóbaksverslun ríkisins)
State Financial Management (Fjársýsla ríkisins)
State Trading Centre (Ríkiskaup)
Statistics Iceland (Hagstofa Íslands)
Taxation Reassessment Committee (Yfirskattanefnd)

Ministry of Industries and Innovation

Agencies
Central Bureau of Applied Research (Skrifstofa rannsóknastofnana atvinnuveganna)
Directorate of Fisheries (Fiskistofa)
Financial Supervisory Authority (Fjármálaeftirlit)
Freshfish Price Directorate (Verðlagsstofa skiptaverðs)
Icelandic Competition Authority (Samkeppniseftirlitið)
Icelandic Food and Veterinary Authority (Matvælastofnun)
Icelandic Patent Office (Einkaleyfastofan)
Icelandic Regional Development Institute (Byggðastofnun)
Icelandic Tourist Board (Ferðamálastofa)
Innovation Center Iceland (Nýsköpunarmiðstöð Íslands)
Marine Research Institute (Hafrannsóknastofnunin)
National Energy Authority (Orkustofnun)
NSA Ventures (Nýsköpunarsjóður atvinnulífsins)

Government-owned corporations
Matis (Matís ohf.)

Ministry of the Interior

Agencies
Bishop's Office (Biskupsstofa)
Courts in Iceland
Icelandic Civil Aviation Administration (Flugmálastjórn Íslands)
Police (Lögregla)
State Directory of Prisons (Fangelsismálastofnun ríkisins)
Sýslumenn
Icelandic Road and Coastal Administration (Vegagerðin)

Government-owned corporations
Isavia ohf.
Neyðarlínan ohf.

Ministry of Welfare

Agencies
Government Agency for Child Protection (Barnaverndarstofa)
Directorate of Health (Embætti landlæknis)
Multicultural Centre (Fjölmenningarsetur)
Icelandic Radiation Safety Authority (Geislavarnir ríkisins)
State Diagnostic and Counselling Centre (Greiningar- og ráðgjafarstöð ríkisins)
Health institutions
Dalvík Health Centre (Heilsugæslustöðin Dalvík)
Clinics
National Hearing and Speech Institute of Iceland (Heyrnar- og talmeinastöð Íslands)
Housing Financing Fund (Íbúðalánasjóður)
Centre for Gender Equality (Jafnréttisstofa)
National University Hospital of Iceland (Landspítali – háskólasjúkrahús)
Medication Payment Committee (Lyfjagreiðslunefnd)
Icelandic Medicines Agency (Lyfjastofnun)
State Mediator (Ríkissáttasemjari)
Akureyri Hospital (Sjúkrahúsið á Akureyri)
Icelandic Health Insurance (Sjúkratryggingar Íslands)
Social Insurance Administration (Tryggingastofnun ríkisins)
Debtors' Ombudsman (Umboðsmaður skuldara)
Administration of Occupational Safety and Health (Vinnueftirlit ríkisins)
Directorate of Labour (Vinnumálastofnun)
National Bioethics Committee (Vísindasiðanefnd)
National Institute for the Blind, Visually Impaired and Deafblind (Þjónustu- og þekkingarmiðstöð fyrir blinda, sjónskerta og daufblinda einstaklinga)
Nursing homes

See also
List of Icelandic ministries
 Government agencies in Norway
 Government agencies in Sweden

 
Iceland
Lists of organizations based in Iceland